House of Councillors elections were held in Japan on 10 July 2022 to elect 125 of the 248 members of the upper house of the National Diet, for a term of six years. The elections occurred after the assassination of Shinzo Abe on 8 July 2022. The elected candidate with the fewest votes in the Kanagawa prefectural district will serve for three years, as the district combined its regular and byelections.

The election occurred within the first year of Fumio Kishida's term as Prime Minister and it saw Kenta Izumi debut as the leader of the opposition Constitutional Democratic Party. The election was overshadowed by the assassination of former Prime Minister Shinzo Abe, which took place two days before ballots were cast. Abe was shot while delivering a campaign speech for Kei Satō, a member of the House of Councillors running for reelection. The assassin, who had previously served in the Japan Maritime Self-Defence Force, was arrested at the scene and reportedly confessed to targeting Abe due to a grudge he held against the Unification Church. Prime Minister Kishida denounced the assassination as an attack on Japan's democracy and vowed to defend a "free and fair election at all cost". In a post-election survey, 62.5 percent of the voters said their votes were not swayed by the assassination, while 15.1 percent said they were.

The ruling Liberal Democratic Party modestly increased its seats in the chamber. Turnout slightly increased compared to the previous election while a new record was set for women elected to the chamber at 28%. Parties supportive of constitutional revision gained a combined total of 93 seats, thus gaining the two-thirds majority needed to trigger the parliamentary procedure which was lost in the 2019 election.

The disparity in the value of a vote between prefectural districts in the election ranged up to 3.03 times, leading to nationwide legal challenges.

Background
Following the closing of the 208th session of the National Diet on 15 June 2022, the Cabinet of Japan held an extraordinary session to schedule an upper house election in which it was determined that the election would be formally announced to the public on June 22 with the vote to be held on 10 July 2022.

In May 2018, the government enacted a revision to the Public Offices Election Law that increased the number of seats in the House of Councillors by six, with three new seats being contested in 2019 and the other three being contested in 2022. As such, three new seats — one in the Saitama at-large district and two in the national PR block — were added to the House of Councillors as a result of the election.

A seat in the Kanagawa at-large district was left vacant following the resignation of Shigefumi Matsuzawa (independent), who was elected to the House of Councillors in the 2019 election. Matsuzawa resigned from his seat in the House of Councillors to run in the 2021 Yokohama mayoral election, for which he came in sixth.  Since the seat was not eligible for a by-election, a merger election was held as a part of this election. This was the first time in 30 years - since the Saitama at-large district held one as part of the 1992 election - that a merger election was held. As a result, the Kanagawa at-large district elected five members this election instead of four, with the fifth-place winner serving for only three years instead of six. Furthermore, in October 2021, Kenji Nakanishi (Liberal Democratic), who was elected to the House of Councillors from the Kanagawa at-large district in the 2016 election, resigned his seat to compete in the 2021 Japanese general election for a seat in the House of Representatives, leaving his seat in the House of Councillors vacant prior to this election as well.

The "Special Postal Voting" system - put in place by the Corona Postal Voting Act passed in response to the global COVID-19 pandemic - was still in effect during this election. This system secured voting opportunities for those who could not vote in-person due to the pandemic. It was the first time the "Special Postal Voting" system was used for a House of Councillors election. In addition, a revision to the Public Offices Election Act was passed in April 2022 that allowed for party political broadcasts to be made through FM broadcasting.

On 8 July 2022, former Prime Minister Shinzo Abe was assassinated in Nara City while delivering a campaign speech for Kei Satō, a member of the House of Councillors running for reelection. The assassination took place just two days before the election. In response, some candidates from the Liberal Democratic Party and other political parties canceled their campaign events on that day. Prime Minister Kishida denounced the assassination as an attack on Japan's democracy and vowed to defend a "free and fair election at all cost". In a post-election survey, 62.5 percent of the voters said their votes were not swayed by the assassination, while 15.1 percent said they were.

At 20:00 (8pm) JST on July 10, when the voting ended, various media outlets across Japan - including NHK and Japan's five major commercial broadcasting networks (Nippon TV, TV Asahi, TBS TV, TV Tokyo, and Fuji TV) - all reported the results of the exit poll all at once. It was reported that the ruling Liberal Democratic Party and their coalition partner Komeito won significantly more seats than was needed for a majority, while the opposition parties of the Constitutional Democratic Party, Democratic Party for the People, and the Japanese Communist Party all lost seats. In addition, the  Nippon Ishin no Kai (also known as the Innovation Party or the Restoration Party) was also projected to gain seats, and the exit poll projected that several independents would acquire seats as well. 

The Democratic Party for the People had been described as "cozying up" to the Liberal Democratic Party (LDP). The lack of policy agreements and electoral pacts led to more opposition candidates contesting in single-seat prefectural districts.

Pre-election Composition

Electoral system 
Seventy-four members were elected by single non-transferable vote (SNTV) and first-past-the-post (FPTP) voting in 45 multi-member and single-member prefectural electoral districts. The nationwide district elected 50 members by D'Hondt proportional representation with optionally open lists; the previous most open list system was modified in 2018 to give parties the option to prioritize certain candidates over the voters' preferences in the proportional election.

Opinion polls

Proportional voting intention

Seat projections

Results
The ruling Liberal Democratic Party modestly increased its seats in the chamber. Turnout slightly increased compared to the previous election while a new record was set for women elected to the chamber at 28%. Parties supportive of constitutional revision (Liberal Democratic Party, Komeito, Nippon Ishin no Kai, and Democratic Party for the People) won a combined total of 93 seats, and maintained the two-thirds majority needed to trigger the parliamentary procedure. Sanseito and NHK Party, with three seats combined, are also in favour of rewriting the Constitution.

The disparity in the value of a vote between prefectural districts in the election ranged up to 3.03 times (with a vote in Kanagawa Prefecture having only one-third the impact of a vote in Fukui Prefecture), leading to nationwide legal challenges. The Supreme Court had previously concluded after Upper House elections in 2010 and 2013 that a maximum vote-weight disparity of around 5 times was in a "state of unconstitutionality", with the current disparity coming somewhat close to that number. Prefectures have been resistant to combining electoral districts within their boundaries.

By constituency

Notes

References

Japan
House of Councillors (Japan) elections
House of Councillors
House of Councillors